L'oiseau bleu is French for "The Blue Bird".

L'oiseau bleu (opera), an opera by Albert Wolff
"L'Oiseau bleu" (song), a J-pop single by Mami Kawada
L'Oiseau bleu (painting) by Jean Metzinger
L'Oiseau Bleu (train), an express train between Antwerp and Paris

See also
The Blue Bird (fairy tale) by Madame d'Aulnoy
The Blue Bird (play) by Maurice Maeterlinck
The Blue Bird (disambiguation)